Roberto Durán Samaniego (born June 16, 1951) is a Panamanian former professional boxer who competed from 1968 to 2001. He held world championships in four weight classes: lightweight, welterweight, light middleweight and middleweight, as well as reigns as the undisputed and lineal lightweight champion, and the lineal welterweight champion. He is also the second boxer to have competed over a span of five decades, the first being Jack Johnson. Durán was known as a versatile, technical brawler and pressure fighter, which earned him the nickname of "Manos de Piedra" ("Hands of Stone") for his formidable punching power and excellent defense.

In 2002, Durán was voted by The Ring magazine as the fifth greatest fighter of the last 80 years, while boxing historian Bert Sugar rated him as the eighth greatest fighter of all time. The Associated Press voted him as the best lightweight of the 20th century, with many considering him the greatest lightweight of all time. Durán retired for good in January 2002 at age 50, following a car crash in Argentina in October 2001, after which he had required life saving surgery. He had previously retired in November 1980, June 1984 and August 1998, only to change his mind. Durán ended his career with a professional record of 119 fights, 103 wins, and 70 knockouts. From May 1971 up until his second fight against Sugar Ray Leonard in November 1980, as well as in his fight against Wilfred Benítez in January 1982, Durán was trained by legendary boxing trainer Ray Arcel.

Early life 
Roberto Durán was born on June 16, 1951, in Guararé, Panama. His mother, Clara Samaniego, was a native of Guararé, and his father, Margarito Durán Sánchez, was from Arizona, United States, and of Mexican descent. He was raised in the slums of El Chorrillo in the district "La Casa de Piedra" (The House of Stone), in Panama City. He began sparring with experienced boxers at the Neco de La Guardia gymnasium when he was only eight years old.

Amateur career 
Durán competed as an amateur, compiling a record of 29–3 (other sources say 18–3 or 13–3), with all 3 losses coming in Durán's first 3 amateur fights. Following his amateur career, Durán made his professional debut in February 1968 at the age of 16.

Professional career

Lightweight 
Durán won his first 31 consecutive professional fights, and scored knockout victories over future Featherweight Champion Ernesto Marcel and former Super Featherweight Champion Hiroshi Kobayashi, culminating in his first title bout in June 1972, where he defeated Ken Buchanan in Madison Square Garden for the WBA Lightweight Championship. Durán, as a 2-to-1 underdog, scored a knockdown against the defending champion just fifteen seconds into the opening round and battered him throughout the bout. He was well ahead on all three cards as the bell rang to end the 13th round, at which time Durán (apparently not hearing the bell) continued to throw a couple of extra punches as Buchanan lay on the ropes. As Durán continued punching, the referee, Johnny LoBianco, grabbed him to pull him away. He pulled down on Durán's arms, which led to a seemingly accidental low blow. Buchanan dropped to the canvas in pain. His trainer Gil Clancy later said he had believed the blow to have been caused by a knee. Durán was not disqualified from the bout; instead, he was deemed as winner by thirteenth-round technical knockout. Columnist Red Smith of The New York Times wrote that LoBianco had to award the victory to Durán, even if the punch was a low blow, as "anything short of pulling a knife is regarded indulgently" in American boxing. Buchanan said he left the fight "with sore balls".

Durán followed up on his title winning performance with several non-title matches. Later that year, in another non-title bout, he lost a ten-round decision to Esteban De Jesús. Durán got back on track with successful title defenses against Jimmy Robertson, Hector Thompson and future Lightweight Champion Guts Ishimatsu. In 1974, Durán avenged his loss to De Jesus with a brutal eleventh round knock out. In 1976, he defeated future Light Welterweight Champion Saoul Mamby. Overall, Durán made twelve successful defenses of his title (eleven coming by knockout) and amassed a record of 62–1, his last defense coming in 1978 when Durán fought a third bout with De Jesus in a unification match wherein Durán once again knocked out De Jesus and captured his WBC Lightweight Championship. Durán gave up the Undisputed Lightweight Championship in February 1979.

Welterweight and The Brawl in Montreal

Vacating the Lightweight title was a buildup for an attempt at the Welterweight title. Durán earned wins against former WBC Welterweight Champion Carlos Palomino and Zeferino Gonzales, among others, setting the stage for a title bout against then-undefeated WBC Welterweight Champion Sugar Ray Leonard. The venue chosen was the Olympic Stadium in Montreal (the same location where Leonard won an Olympic gold medal during the 1976 Summer Olympics). Durán resented the fact that he was getting only one-fifth of the money that Leonard was getting, despite the fact that Durán was entering the bout with an incredible 71–1 record and seen by many as the best boxer of the decade of the 1970s. To the surprise of Leonard and his camp, who had expected a warm homecoming from the place where Leonard had won Olympic gold, Leonard only got a mixed reception in Montreal, while Durán was incredibly popular with the crowd, with Leonard later admitting that Durán's popularity in Canada "threw me for a loop". On June 20, 1980, Durán captured the WBC Welterweight title by defeating Leonard via a 15-round unanimous decision (145–144, 148–147, 146–144), although it was incorrectly announced as a majority decision in the ring with the 148–147 scorecard being incorrectly announced as 147–147. The fight became known as "The Brawl in Montreal".

"No Más" in New Orleans 
After defeating Leonard in Montreal, Durán gained iconic status in his home country, Panama. Leonard initiated the rematch clause and asked for the fight to be the following November. In their second fight, Leonard successfully changed his tactics, using more footwork and movement than he had in their first fight, and Durán was unable to get Leonard against the ropes. During the seventh round, after Leonard had gained a slight lead on the scorecards, he began taunting and mocking Durán. Towards the end of the eighth round, Durán suddenly stopped fighting, and according to referee Octavio Meyran and ABC commentator Howard Cosell, Durán repeatedly said "No más" ("no more"), which was denied by Durán, his cornermen Ray Arcel and Freddie Brown, and his manager Carlos Eleta, with Durán claiming he had said "No quiero pelear con el payaso" ("I do not want to fight with this clown [Leonard]"). According to Meyran, in addition to saying "No más", Durán also said in broken English "I don't box anymore". In a 2016 interview, Durán claimed that what he actually said was, "No sigo" ("I won't go on"). For a brief time after the "No más" debacle, Durán retired from boxing, but soon changed his mind, not wanting to end on such a bad note.

Light middleweight and middleweight

He took some time to recover from that fight and gained even more weight to contend for the WBC Light Middleweight title, but losing in his first attempt at a championship in that division on January 30, 1982, against Wilfred Benítez by a 15-round unanimous decision, this after having defeated Nino Gonzalez and Luigi Minchillo, two rated Light Middleweights, both by ten-round decisions in non-title bouts. Durán was also to lose his comeback fight in September 1982 in Detroit. Kirkland Laing, from London, shocked the boxing world, producing the type of display his talents promised yet he so rarely produced, taking the split decision. After being relegated to a 10-round walk out win over Englishman Jimmy Batten at The Battle of The Champions in Miami, Durán signed with promoter Bob Arum. This marked the beginning of a comeback in which he beat former world champion and now hall of famer José Cuevas via a fourth round knock-out, which earned him a second crack at the light middleweight title, this time against WBA Champion Davey Moore.

The WBA title bout took place at Madison Square Garden on June 16, 1983, which also happened to be Durán's 32nd birthday. The still inexperienced Moore (12–0) was game through the first three rounds, but by the 4th, Durán said he knew Moore couldn't hurt him, and an onslaught began. The pro-Durán crowd at ringside cheered as Durán relentlessly punished Moore. By the end of the sixth round, Moore's eye had swollen shut and he was floored near the end of the seventh. Finally the fight was stopped in the eighth round as Moore was taking a horrific beating and Durán won his third world title. After the victory, Durán was hoisted up in the air as the crowd sang "Happy Birthday" to a sobbing Durán.

Durán later fought for the World Middleweight Championship, meeting Marvelous Marvin Hagler in Las Vegas on November 10, 1983. During the fight, Duran broke his hand and lost in a very competitive fight that went the full fifteen rounds. After 13 rounds, two of the judges had Durán one point ahead, and the other judge had it even. Hagler fought tenaciously to win the final two rounds and get a unanimous decision victory. The judges' scores were 144–142, 144–143, and 146–145.  Despite the loss, Durán became the second man to take Hagler to a fifteen-round decision (Vito Antuofermo was the other) and the only one to do so while Hagler was the world champion.

In June 1984, Durán was stripped of his Light Middleweight title when the WBA did not approve of his fight with WBC Champion Thomas "Hitman" Hearns and took away recognition of Durán as world champion the moment Durán stepped into the ring to box Hearns. Durán again made history in the fight, but this time it was the wrong kind. Hearns dropped Durán twice in the first round and as he rose to his feet after the second knockdown, which ended the round, the former champion did not know where his corner was. Hearns went on to knock Durán down a third time in the second round and the fight was stopped, marking the first time in his career that Durán had been knocked out in a fight (the "No Más" fight was officially recorded as a technical knockout, because Durán quit). Durán then retired for a second time, but changed his mind over a year later, and was back fighting in early 1986.

Durán did not contend another title fight until 1989, but made the shot count when he won the WBC Middleweight title from Iran Barkley in February. The fight is considered one of Durán's greatest achievements, as the 37-year-old former lightweight champion took the middleweight crown, his fourth title. In a tough, back-and-forth fight, Durán knocked Barkley down in the eleventh round and Durán won a split decision (118–112, 116–112, 113–116). The bout was named the 1989 "Fight of the Year" by The Ring.

Super middleweight 

Duran moved up to super middleweight for a third fight with Sugar Ray Leonard in December 1989 (a fight dubbed Uno Más — One More — by promoters), where Leonard's WBC super-middleweight title was on the line, although Leonard's camp insisted that the fight with Durán be at a 162lbs catchweight instead of the 168lbs super-middleweight limit that Durán favoured. In the end, both weighed in below the 160lbs middleweight limit. Durán was uncharacteristically flat for most of what was a strange fight. Although Leonard won the fight by a wide unanimous decision (120–110, 119–109, 116–111), by the end of the fight Leonard looked the worse for wear as he had suffered several bad cuts. Leonard's lip was busted by a headbutt in the fourth round, his left eye was cut in the eleventh round and his right eye was cut in the twelfth round. The cuts required more than 60 stitches. Durán didn't fight again until 1991, so had given up his WBC middleweight crown that he had won against Barkley. Durán seemed to be in decline after the third fight against Leonard, but he persisted and worked his way into title shots for the lesser IBC super-middleweight and middleweight titles in 1994, 1995 and 1996.

Durán fought Vinny Pazienza twice, in June 1994 and January 1995, for the IBC Super Middleweight Championship, with Pazienza winning both times by unanimous decision. In the first fight, Durán put Pazienza down in Rounds 2 and 5, but referee Joe Cortez controversially ruled the Round 2 knockdown to be a slip. The first fight divided the people watching as some felt that Durán had won a close fight, but others felt that Pazienza had won either narrowly or widely after finishing strongly in the last five rounds. The second fight was more lopsided in Pazienza's favour, as despite the official judges giving Pazienza the win by scores of 116–112, 117–111 and 118–110, the TV commentators expressed puzzlement at the closeness of the official scoring as they thought that Pazienza had won every round in a 120–108 shutout.

In 1996, Durán fought Héctor Camacho for the vacant IBC Middleweight Championship. At the end of the fight, fans and TV commentators seemed in complete agreement that Durán had won the fight in an excellent performance, but the three judges saw the fight very differently and awarded Camacho the victory by a very controversial unanimous decision. Durán's old rival, Sugar Ray Leonard, commentating at ringside, was baffled at the scoring and called it an early Christmas gift for Camacho, with the result motivating Leonard enough to come out of a 6-year boxing retirement to face Camacho himself in 1997. In 1997, Durán was defeated by former champion Jorge Castro in Argentina. Durán then fought Castro in a rematch bout in Panama and won via unanimous decision, maintaining his unbeaten record in Panama.

In 1998, at the age of 47, he challenged 28-year-old WBA Middleweight Champion William Joppy. Joppy, a trim, quick-fisted fighter, battered Durán to defeat in just 3 rounds. It was Durán's most emphatic loss since the Hearns fight, over a decade earlier. Durán then announced his retirement for the third time in August 1998, but soon changed his mind and was back fighting in March 1999.

In June 2000, Durán avenged a previous loss to Pat Lawlor from 9 years before and won the NBA Super Middleweight Championship on his 49th birthday. He lost the title a year later to Héctor Camacho in a rematch bout and in what would be Durán's final fight.

Retirement 

In October 2001, Durán traveled to Argentina to promote a salsa music CD that he had just released. While there, he was involved in a car crash and required life-saving surgery. After that incident, he announced his retirement from boxing at the age of 50.

Announcing his retirement, Durán cited the weight issues of his friend, Argentinian football legend Diego Maradona, as motivation for getting back in shape, stating "as of now, I am exercising so that when the [retirement] honors arrive the people will see me in shape. I don't want to [look] like Maradona did, all fat."

Durán's five world title belts, which he won in four different divisions, were stolen from his house in Panama in 1993 during a robbery allegedly staged by his brother-in-law, who gave them to memorabilia seller Luis González Báez, who stood trial for trying to sell stolen goods. González Báez allegedly sold the belts to undercover FBI agents. He alleged that Durán authorized the sale of the five belts to him during a time that Durán was facing financial trouble. On September 23, 2003, a federal judge in Florida ordered the five belts returned to Durán.

His 70 wins by knockout place him in an exclusive group of boxers who have won 50 or more fights by knockout. He is ranked number 28 on The Ring'''s list of 100 greatest punchers of all time.

On October 14, 2006, Durán was inducted into the World Boxing Hall of Fame in Riverside, California, and on June 10, 2007, into the International Boxing Hall of Fame in Canastota, New York.

In June  2020, Durán was diagnosed with Covid-19 after going to hospital with common cold symptoms. Durán underwent treatment for the disease. Coincidentally, the diagnosis came on the 48th anniversary of Durán's first world title victory against Ken Buchanan, which took place on June 26, 1972. He was released from the hospital weeks later.

Today he is the brand ambassador of Panama Blue, Panama's premium bottled water.

Durán is a licensed ultralight aircraft pilot in Panama. He flew a Quick Silver MX model.

Durán's daughter, Irichelle Durán, was a professional boxer herself who garnered a record of one win and two losses in three bouts, with one win by knockout. She is a resident of Puerto Rico.

 Appearances in film/music 

 Film 

Durán's first appearance in a movie was in the 1979 film Rocky II as a lightning-fast sparring partner for Rocky Balboa. Outside of this, Durán had minor roles in Harlem Nights.

Durán's life and boxing career are told in the documentary Los puños de una nación ("The Fists of a Nation") by Panamanian filmmaker Pituka Ortega-Heilbron. Durán also appears very briefly during an interview for the documentary The Panama Deception (1992), in which he recounts his experience during the United States invasion of Panama.

The biopic Hands of Stone stars Édgar Ramírez as Durán, Robert De Niro as Ray Arcel and Usher as Sugar Ray Leonard, and was released on August 26, 2016.

 Television 
Durán played the drug lord Jesús Maroto in Miami Vice season two, episode 19.

In "Corporate Warriors", the fourth episode of the second season of the hit American crime drama CSI: NY, Durán is mentioned by the medical examiner while discussing a dead man found to have bone grafts put in his hands to boost his punching power.

 Music 
The song "The Eyes of Roberto Durán" by Tom Russell, from the album The Long Way Around, contains the lyric, "Panama City – it's three in the morning; they're talking 'bout the Hands of Stone."

Durán is mentioned in the third verse of Nas' original demo for It Ain't Hard to Tell in the line: "Metaphors of murder man, hittin' like Roberto Durán, hold the mic in my hand, my lifespan."

The musician Jackie Leven recorded a song ("Museum of Childhood") that explores the events of the second world title fight between Durán and Sugar Ray Leonard.

Jazz musician Miles Davis, an avid boxing fan, recorded a tribute to Roberto Durán titled "Duran".

Durán is also mentioned in the third verse of Paul Thorn's "Hammer and Nail," based on Thorn's nationally televised fight with Durán:

Texas rockabilly band Reverend Horton Heat mentions Durán in their song "Eat Steak," off of their album Smoke 'Em If You Got 'Em''.

Durán is mentioned in the salsa song Pa'l Bailador by Colombian singer Joe Arroyo in 1989, "A Roberto Duran, Aya en Panama, Mano de Piedra!" (To Roberto Duran, in Panama, Hands of Stones!)

Durán is referenced multiple times in the song "Uno Mas" by Alex Soria's band Chino.

Durán's 1983 fight with Davey Moore is referenced in the 2014 single, "The Possum," by American songwriter, Sun Kil Moon (i.e. Mark Kozelek), who often writes about boxers. Kozelek sings:
"They threw hard vicious guttural B-flats that shook their opponent /
Like a tough Roberto "Hands of Stone" Durán, in the seventh round /
Davey Moore, June 16, 1983..."

Durán himself was a Salsa singer once, leading an orchestra named "Felicidad" after his wife. They recorded albums and frequented television shows in Latin America.

Durán is also mentioned by former rap duo Max and Sam (consisting of sports analyst Max Kellerman and his brother Sam) in their song 'Young Man Rumble' with the line "Got skills got stamina got Hands of Stone like the champ from Panama."

Professional boxing record

See also 
List of undisputed boxing champions
List of boxing families
List of boxing quadruple champions

References

External links

Official website, hosted by CMG Worldwide as Durán's representative
Roberto Durán biography at the International Boxing Hall of Fame

1951 births
Living people
People from Guararé
International Boxing Hall of Fame inductees
Panamanian people of Mexican descent
Panamanian people of American descent
World Boxing Association champions
World Boxing Council champions
Panamanian aviators
Panamanian male boxers
Super-middleweight boxers
The Ring (magazine) champions
World lightweight boxing champions
World welterweight boxing champions
World light-middleweight boxing champions
World middleweight boxing champions
Salsa musicians
20th-century Panamanian male singers
20th-century Panamanian singers